Legislative Council elections were held in the Cook Islands in 1947, the first after the establishment of the new legislature.

Background
The Cook Islands Legislative Council was formed following legislation passed in October 1946, and consisted of ten members indirectly elected by island councils (four from Rarotonga and six from smaller islands), ten civil servants appointed by the Governor-General of New Zealand and the Resident Commissioner, who was president of the council. The island councils were made partially elective, and the elected members of the councils were eligible to be candidates for election to the Legislative Council. It was intended that the elected European member of Rarotonga Island Council would automatically become the European member of the Legislative Council. However, the legislation published required the European member to be elected by indigenous members of the Island Council.

The island council elections took place in March. In Rarotonga there was a contested election for the European seat (which Europeans living anywhere in the Cook Islands could vote for) for the first time in several years; incumbent member Willie Watson defeated Stuart Kingan by 47 votes to 37, with all but two registered voters casting ballots.

Results
The elected members included one woman, Tararo Jane Ariki, ariki of Mauke island.

The official members included the Acting Resident Agent of Aitutaki, the Chief Medical Officer, the Director of Agriculture, the Education Officer, the Resident Agents of Atiu, Mangaia, Mauke, Penrhyn and Rakahanga, and the Treasurer.

Aftermath
The newly elected Council met for the first time on 5 November 1947.

References

1947 elections in Oceania
1947 in the Cook Islands
Elections in the Cook Islands